Delta North Senatorial District in Delta State, Nigeria, covers 9 local governments namely Aniocha North, Aniocha South, Ika North East, Ika South, Nndokwa East, Nndokwa West, Oshimili South, Oshimili North and Ukwuani. The current representative of Delta North is Peter Nwaoboshi of the People’s Democratic Party, PDP.

List of senators representing Delta North

References 

Politics of Delta State
Senatorial districts in Nigeria
Members of the Senate (Nigeria)